Suzanne Cory  (born 11 March 1942) is an Australian molecular biologist.  She has worked on the genetics of the immune system and cancer and has lobbied her country to invest in science. She is married to fellow scientist Jerry Adams, also a WEHI scientist, whom she met while studying for her PhD at the University of Cambridge, England.

Education and personal life 
Suzanne Cory was raised in the Kew suburbs of Melbourne, Australia. She attended Canterbury Girls' Secondary College, followed by University High School, Melbourne. Her further education includes undergraduate studies at the University of Melbourne and earning a PhD from the MRC Laboratory of Molecular Biology (LMB) in Cambridge, England. Cory attended the LMB at the same time as the Nobel Prize winners Francis Crick, known for his co-discovery of the structure of DNA, and Frederick Sanger, who revolutionised nucleic acid sequencing. While obtaining her PhD, Cory used Sanger's RNA sequencing techniques to identify the sequence of transfer RNA. Also, during her time at the LMB, Cory met her current husband, Jerry Adams, a scientist from the United States. The two scientists later married and had two daughters.

Research and accomplishments 
Following her time at the LMB, Cory travelled to the University of Geneva for her post-doctoral studies.  While in Geneva, she focused on sequencing the RNA of R17 bacteriophage for the purpose of using it as a model.

In 1971, Cory and her husband began their research at the Walter and Eliza Hall Institute of Medical Research, located in Melbourne, Australia.  The two scientists helped introduce new scientific technology and methods they had been exposed to in Geneva and Cambridge, which helped expand and better the molecular biology research in Australia.  They initially chose to study the genetic component of immunity, discovering that antibody genes are a combination of pieces and can be arranged in a variety of ways. This discovery helped explain the diversity of the immune system and its ability to fight a large array of harmful cell invaders.

After a decade of studying the immune system, Cory's lab switched their focus to cancer and the genetic components of various cancers.  Her lab discovered the genetic mutations that lead to Burkitt's lymphoma and Follicular lymphoma.  One of the main focuses of their cancer cell research is on cell proliferation and cell death.  In particular, the oncoprotein Myc and the Bcl-2 protein family are of interest to her current research lab.

Bcl-2 is an important family of intracellular proteins that helps regulate apoptosis, or cell suicide.  Bcl-2, paired with other regulators, prevents caspases from being activated.  The caspases, a type of protease, remain inactive until signaled through a cascade to degrade the proteins that make up a cell. Cory's lab has developed Bcl2-blocking agents called BH3 mimetics, which, when paired with low-dose chemotherapy, have had positive results treating specific types of aggressive lymphomas.

Cory is the immediate past President of the Australian Academy of Science. She was the first-elected female President of the Academy and took office on 7 May 2010 for a four-year term, replacing the former president, Professor Kurt Lambeck.  Since its formation in 1954, there has only been one other female president of the Australian Academy of Science, Professor Dorothy Hill, who filled in for Professor David Forbes Martyn after his death in 1970.

Cory was the Director of the Walter and Eliza Hall Institute of Medical Research (WEHI), from 1996 until 30 June 2009 and remains a faculty member, having rejoined the institute's Molecular Genetics of Cancer Division. Her current research focuses on genetic changes in blood cancers and the effects of chemotherapeutic drugs on the cancer cells.  Cory's work has been published in research journals including Blood (journal), The EMBO Journal, Nature (journal), Cell Death & Differentiation, and Proceedings of the National Academy of Sciences of the United States of America.

The Suzanne Cory High School opened in Cory's honour in 2011.  The public high school caters to 800 students from grades 9-12.  Qualified students gain entry to the school through a three-hour aptitude test, which is also used for placement into three other highly selective Australian high schools.  The school is in close proximity to Victoria University, which allows students access to the school's facilities and staff.

Awards and honors

1986 — elected a Fellow of the Australian Academy of Science
1992 — elected a Fellow of the Royal Society
1997 — awarded Macfarlane Burnet Medal and Lecture of the Australian Academy of Science
1997 — elected Fellow of the Royal Society of Victoria (FRSV)
1998 — received Charles S. Mott Prize of the General Motors Cancer Research Foundation (joint recipient)
1999 — named a Companion of the Order of Australia
2001 — recipient of a L'Oréal-UNESCO Award for Women in Science
2002 — awarded the Royal Medal of the Royal Society
2004 — elected an Academician of the Pontifical Academy of Sciences
2009 — named a Chevalier of the Legion of Honor and was presented with her award in Canberra, Australia, by the Ambassador of France in Australia, Michel Filhol
2011 — Suzanne Cory High School commenced in Werribee, Victoria
2011 — awarded the Association for International Cancer Research Colin Thomson Medal
2012 — winner, CSIRO Eureka Prize for Leadership in Science
2013 — elected as a Fellow of the inaugural Class of the American Association for Cancer Research (AACR) Academy
2014 — delivered the annual ABC Boyer Lectures
2021 — elected Fellow of the Australian Academy of Health and Medical Sciences

References

External links 
 Overview of directorship and research at the Walter and Eliza Hall Institute.
 Smith, Deborah: Woman of science, The Age, 7 August 2010.
 
 Suzanne Cory on Women in Science: International Differences, CSHL Digital Archives

Australian medical researchers
Australian women scientists
Women medical researchers
1942 births
Living people
Australia Prize recipients
Chevaliers of the Légion d'honneur
Companions of the Order of Australia
Fellows of the Australian Academy of Science
Fellows of the Royal Society
Australian Fellows of the Royal Society
Female Fellows of the Royal Society
L'Oréal-UNESCO Awards for Women in Science laureates
Foreign associates of the National Academy of Sciences
Members of the French Academy of Sciences
Members of the Pontifical Academy of Sciences
Presidents of the Australian Academy of Science
Royal Medal winners
People educated at University High School, Melbourne
WEHI alumni
Place of birth missing (living people)
20th-century Australian scientists
21st-century Australian scientists
20th-century biologists
21st-century biologists
20th-century American women scientists
21st-century American women scientists
Fellows of the AACR Academy
Fellows of the Australian Academy of Health and Medical Sciences
People from Kew, Victoria
Scientists from Melbourne
People educated at Canterbury Girls' Secondary College